Independent Democratic Party may refer to:

Nullifier Party (USA, 1832) (Sometimes called the 'Independent Democratic Party')
 A political party formed mostly by barnburners meeting in Utica, New York on June 22nd of 1848
Democratic Party (UK, 1942)
Independent Democratic Party (India)
Independent Democratic Party of Russia
Independent Democratic Party (Yugoslavia)